Lindu or Tado is an Austronesian language of Central Sulawesi, Indonesia spoken by the Lindu people. It is closely related to Moma.

References

Further reading

 

Kaili–Pamona languages
Languages of Sulawesi